is an action role-playing video game developed and published by Konami for the Family Computer Disk System. It was released in Japan on February 20, 1987.  During this time, RPGs had a particular look and feel, primarily utilizing sword and magic motifs.  Esper Dream takes place instead in a fairy tale world featuring a young boy with ESP talents who wields a gun.

Konami released the game as an i-application for cellular phone use as part of the Konami masterpiece series on February 1, 2007. In the same year, it was made available for download in Japan as part of the Wii Virtual Console on October 2.

A sequel, was released for the Family Computer on June 26, 1992.

Gameplay

Roaming and static enemy positions are made visible in the world as a set of paw prints. Fights take place in an enclosed area where the player must shoot the enemies until they are eliminated.  Traditional RPG elements include the collection of experience points and money by defeating monsters, increasing hit points and esper points (magic) through level raises, and purchasing better equipment from towns located deeper in the game.

References

External links
Esper Dream at Nintendo 
Esper Dream at Konami Mobile 

Role-playing video games
Konami games
Famicom Disk System games
Action role-playing video games
Mobile games
Single-player video games
Virtual Console games
Virtual Console games for Wii U
Japan-exclusive video games
2014 soundtrack albums
1987 video games
Video games about psychic powers
Video games scored by Kinuyo Yamashita
Video games developed in Japan